Trivium is an American heavy metal band from Orlando, Florida. Formed in 1999, the group's first recording lineup included vocalist and guitarist Matt Heafy, bassist Brent Young and drummer Travis Smith. After a pair of demos, the band released its debut studio album Ember to Inferno in 2003, which was written entirely by Heafy. Guitarist Corey Beaulieu joined after the album's recording, and the following year Paolo Gregoletto replaced Young. The band released Ascendancy in 2005, which featured songwriting credits for Beaulieu and producer Jason Suecof. The album was followed the next year by The Crusade, written by Heafy with Beaulieu and Gregoletto. Also in 2006, the band recorded a cover version of Metallica's "Master of Puppets" for the Kerrang! release Remastered: Metallica's Master of Puppets Revisited.

Shogun was released in 2008, credited to the whole band. The band also covered "Iron Maiden", originally by the band of the same name, for the Kerrang! tribute album Maiden Heaven: A Tribute to Iron Maiden the same year. In 2010, Nick Augusto replaced Smith and co-wrote and performed on "Shattering the Skies Above" for the compilation God of War: Blood & Metal, followed by 2011's In Waves and 2013's Vengeance Falls. He left in 2014, with the band's former drum technician Mat Madiro taking his place for the 2015 album Silence in the Snow, again credited to the whole band. In late 2015, Paul Wandtke joined the band to replace Madiro. Trivium recorded another Iron Maiden cover for the 2016 follow-up to Maiden Heaven, contributing the track "For the Greater Good of God" to the free Kerrang! companion album.

In December 2016, Trivium released a deluxe edition of debut album Ember to Inferno subtitled Ab Initio, which contained both early demos as well as the 2004 Flavus demo. Following the addition of new drummer Alex Bent, the band released The Sin and the Sentence in October 2017, which was written by Heafy, Beaulieu and Gregoletto.

Songs

Footnotes

References

External links
List of Trivium songs at AllMusic
Trivium official website

Trivium